Casalbore is a town and comune in the province of Avellino, Campania, Italy.

Located in the Irpinia historical region, its territory borders the municipalities of Buonalbergo, Ginestra degli Schiavoni, Montecalvo Irpino, and San Giorgio La Molara.

Twin towns — sister cities
Casalbore is twinned with:

  Vinovo, Italy (2011)

References

Cities and towns in Campania